Mer or MER may refer to:

Business
 Management expense ratio
 Market exchange rate
 Merrill Lynch's former NYSE stock symbol

People
 Francis Mer (born 1939), a French businessman, industrialist and politician, former Minister of the Economy
 Gideon Mer (1894-1961), an Israeli scientist working mostly on the eradication of malaria
 M.E.R. (Maria Elizabeth Rothmann), an Afrikaner writer
 Mer (community), a community found primarily in the Indian state of Gujarat

Places
 Mer, Loir-et-Cher, a commune in the Loir-et-Cher département of France
 Merionethshire, historic county in Wales, Chapman code MER
 Murray Island, Queensland, known locally as Mer, an Australian island

Sports
 Meralco Bolts, a team in the Philippine Basketball Association

Science
 Mer, a synonym for repeat unit in chemistry
 Mer, a type of geometric isomer of octahedral complexes (see fac–mer isomerism)
 -mer, an affix meaning "part", used in several words in chemistry and biology
 MERTK, MER, or proto-oncogene tyrosine-protein kinase MER, a human enzyme
 Membrane estrogen receptor, or mER, a receptor for estrogen
 Proto-oncogene tyrosine-protein kinase MER (or MERTK or Mer)
 abbreviation of Meridional, a direction on a globe
 Mercury transporter, Mer Superfamily of transport proteins

Technology
 Mer (software distribution), a software distribution for operating systems based upon the Linux kernel targeted at mobile devices
 Mars Exploration Rover, one of a pair of robotic rovers exploring the surface of Mars
 Modulation error ratio, a measure in communications for evaluation of digital transmission equipment
 Mechanical equipment room or mechanical room, used for HVAC, water heaters, plumbing and electrical equipment
 Project Mer, a 1958 U.S. Navy human spaceflight proposal to the Advanced Research Projects Agency

Transport
 Manx Electric Railway, an interurban tramway on the Isle of Man
 Merthyr Tydfil railway station (National Rail station code), a railway station in Wales

Other uses
 MER, acronym for "Minimum Essential Requirements"
 Mer (community), a community native to the Porbandar region in Saurashtra, India
 Mer, a planet from The Pirates of Dark Water
 Mer, a race in the Elder Scrolls series of video games
 Mer, a given name related to Margarete
 Mer, the French word for "sea"
 "Mer", a song by band Hyukoh
 Mer language (disambiguation)
 Middle East Report, a publication of the Middle East Research and Information Project
 Movement for European Reform, a pan-European political group

See also
 La mer (disambiguation)
 Mers (disambiguation)
 Merfolk (disambiguation), name of the half human, half fish undersea species for the fictional mermen and mermaids
 Mar (disambiguation)
 Mir (disambiguation)
 Merr (disambiguation)
 Meher (disambiguation)
 Mur (disambiguation)
 Murre (bird)
 Myrrh